NGC 3432 is a spiral galaxy that can be found in the constellation Leo Minor. It is seen edge-on and with its current interaction with UGC 5983, a near by dwarf galaxy, it features tidal filaments and intense star formation, which is why it was listed in Halton Arp's Atlas of Peculiar Galaxies.

References

External links
 
 

Galaxies discovered in 1787
Barred spiral galaxies
Leo Minor
3432
05986
32643
206
17870319
Interacting galaxies